Cymindis etrusca is a species of ground beetle in the subfamily Harpalinae. It was described by M. C. Bassi in 1834.

References

etrusca
Beetles described in 1834